Holcocera grenadensis is a moth in the family Blastobasidae. It is found on the Caribbean islands of Grenada and Dominica.

The length of the forewings is 5.9-6.2 mm. The ground color of the forewings is brown intermixed with pale-brown scales, irregularly streaked with pale greyish-brown scales above the veins. The hindwing dorsal and ventral surfaces are uniformly brownish grey, darkening to the outer margin.

References

Moths described in 1897
grenadensis